Magnus Holm Jacobsen (born 23 May 2000) is a Faroese footballer who plays as a midfielder for B36 Tórshavn and the Faroe Islands national team.

Career
Jacobsen made his international debut for the Faroe Islands on 11 November 2020 in a friendly match against Lithuania.

Career statistics

International

References

External links
 Magnus Jacobsen at FaroeSoccer.com
 
 

2000 births
Living people
People from Tórshavn Municipality
Faroese footballers
Faroe Islands youth international footballers
Faroe Islands under-21 international footballers
Faroe Islands international footballers
Faroese expatriate footballers
Expatriate footballers in Portugal
Association football midfielders
B36 Tórshavn players
F.C. Paços de Ferreira players
Faroe Islands Premier League players
2. deild players